James A. Porter (novelist) (1836-Jan. 13, 1897) was born in Bellefontaine, Logan County, Ohio.  He served as a bugler and bandmaster in the U.S. Civil War. Later, he was a music teacher in Galion, Urbana, and Greenville. After his retirement from teaching, he wrote a novel called
A Prince of Anahuac; A Histori-Traditional Story, which was published by The Crawford Company, Galion, Ohio, in 1894.

The book is available from Google Books and will soon be available from Project Gutenberg.

Reference: Ohio authors and their books : biographical data and selective bibliographies for Ohio authors, native and resident, 1796-1950
by William Coyle; Ernest Wessen; Adlai E Stevenson; James Thurber
Cleveland, World Pub. Co., 1962, p. 505.

1836 births
1897 deaths
19th-century American novelists
American male novelists
People from Bellefontaine, Ohio
Novelists from Ohio
19th-century American male writers